is a Japanese politician and member for the House of Representatives for the Japanese Communist Party.

1940 births
Living people
People from Hokkaido
Female members of the House of Representatives (Japan)
Members of the House of Representatives (Japan)
Japanese Communist Party politicians
Hokkaido University alumni
21st-century Japanese politicians
21st-century Japanese women politicians
20th-century Japanese women politicians
20th-century Japanese politicians